The 1998 South Florida Bulls football team represented the University of South Florida (USF) in the 1998 NCAA Division I-AA football season, and was the second team fielded by the school. The Bulls were led by head coach Jim Leavitt in his second year, played their home games at Tampa Stadium and Raymond James Stadium in Tampa, Florida and competed as a Division I-AA Independent. The Bulls finished the season with a record of eight wins and three losses (8–3).

Schedule

References

South Florida
South Florida Bulls football seasons
South Florida Bulls football